Celtis conferta is a flowering plant in the hemp and hackberry family. It has a disjunct range in the Australasian region, with two subspecies.

Subspecies
Celtis conferta subsp. conferta — New Caledonia
Celtis conferta subsp. amblyphylla — Lord Howe Island

References

External links

conferta
Flora of New Caledonia
Plants described in 1873
Rosales of Australia
Taxa named by Jules Émile Planchon